8-Hydroxyamoxapine is an active metabolite of the antidepressant drug amoxapine (Asendin). It contributes to amoxapine's pharmacology. It is a serotonin-norepinephrine reuptake inhibitor (SNRI) with similar norepinephrine, but more serotonin, reuptake inhibition as its parent compound. It plays a part in balancing amoxapine's ratio of serotonin to norepinephrine transporter blockage.

See also 
 7-Hydroxyamoxapine

References 

Dibenzoxazepines
Piperazines
Human drug metabolites
Chloroarenes